Pseudoceocephalini is a tribe of primitive weevils in the family of beetles known as Brentidae. There are at least 40 genera and 150 described species in Pseudoceocephalini.

Genera
These 48 genera belong to the tribe Pseudoceocephalini:

 Agrioblepis Kleine, 1921 i c g
 Amerismus Lacordaire, 1865 i c g
 Anactorus Damoiseau, 1967 i c g
 Anampyx Damoiseau, 1963 i c g
 Aphelampyx Quentin, 1966 i c g
 Atenophthalmus Kleine, 1920 i c g
 Autarcus Senna, 1892 i c g
 Cacoschizus Sharp, 1900 i c g
 Calyptulus Kleine, 1922 i c g
 Chalybdicus Kleine, 1922 i c g
 Dacetellum Hedicke, 1922 i c g
 Eubactrus Lacordaire, 1865 i c g
 Eumecopodus Calabresi, 1920 i c g
 Gynandrorhynchus Lacordaire, 1865 i c g
 Hetaeroceocephalus Kleine, 1921 i c g
 Heterothesis Kleine, 1914 i c g
 Hormocerus Schoenherr, 1823 i c g
 Isoceocephalus Kleine, 1920 i c g
 Metatrachelus Kleine, 1925 i c g
 Neomygaleicus De Muizon, 1960 i c g
 Nothogaster Lacordaire, 1865 i c g
 Oxyscapanus Damoiseau, 1989 i c g
 Palaeoceocephalus Kleine, 1920 i c g
 Paraceocephalus Kleine, 1944 i c g
 Paryphobrenthus Kolbe, 1897 i c g
 Peraprophthalmus Kleine, 1923 i c g
 Periceocephalus Kleine, 1922 i c g
 Phacecerus Schoenherr, 1840 i c g
 Phocylides Pascoe, 1872 i c g
 Piazocnemis Lacordaire, 1865 i c g
 Pithoderes Calabresi, 1920 i c g
 Prodector Pascoe, 1862 i c g
 Proephebocerus Calabresi, 1920 i c g
 Pseudoceocephalus Kleine, 1920 i c g
 Pseudomygaleicus De Muizon, 1960 i c g
 Pterygostomus Lacordaire, 1865 i c g
 Pyresthema Kleine, 1922 i c g
 Rhinopteryx Lacordaire, 1865 i c g
 Schizotrachelus Lacordaire, 1865 i c g
 Schizuropterus Kleine, 1925 i c g
 Sennaiella Alonso-Zarazaga, Lyal, Bartolozzi and Sforzi, 1999 i c g
 Storeosomus Lacordaire, 1865 i c g
 Stroggylosternum Kleine, 1922 i c g
 Temnolaimus Chevrolat, 1839 i c g
 Thoracobrenthus Damoiseau, 1961 i c g
 Uroptera Berthold, 1827 i c g
 Uropteroides Kleine, 1922 i c g
 Zetophloeus Lacordaire, 1865 i c g

Data sources: i = ITIS, c = Catalogue of Life, g = GBIF, b = Bugguide.net

References

Further reading

 
 
 
 
 
 
 
 
 
 
 
 
 

Brentidae